The Khazar hypothesis of Cossack ancestry, also known as the Khazarism, Khazar Cossack myth or Khazar myth, is a claim (a "founding myth") that the Ukrainian Cossacks descended from Slavicised Khazars. With traces in the 17th century, it was propagated in the 18th century as an element of the legitimization of the Ukrainian Cossack autonomy. In particular, it was put forth in the Constitution of Pylyp Orlyk. Its origin may be traced to the contemporary Polish historiography.

See also
Sarmatism
Jewish Cossacks

References

Ukrainian Cossacks
Khazars
Pseudohistory

uk:Хозарський козацький міф